Shahzada Shahzada Mirza Muhammad Abu Bakr (1837–13 October 1857) was a son of Mughal emperor Bahadur Shah II and his queen Rajun Khawas. He also served the Mughal army during the war of 1857 and was executed on 13 October 1857.

References

1835 births
1857 deaths
Mughal princes